François Cormier-Bouligeon (27 May 1972) is a French politician of La République En Marche! (LREM) who has been serving as a member of the French National Assembly since the 2017 elections, representing the Ardennes's 2nd constituency.

Political career
Cormier-Bouligeon serves as member of the Committee on Cultural Affairs and Education. In addition to his committee assignments, he is a member of the French-Moroccan Parliamentary Friendship Group.

Political positions
In July 2019, Cormier-Bouligeon voted in favor of the French ratification of the European Union’s Comprehensive Economic and Trade Agreement (CETA) with Canada.

In 2022, Cormier-Bouligeon was one of eight parliamentarians who asked President of the National Assembly Yaël Braun-Pivet to set up an investigation committee to look into alleged Russian financing of political parties.

See also
 2017 French legislative election

References

1972 births
Living people
Deputies of the 15th National Assembly of the French Fifth Republic
La République En Marche! politicians
Place of birth missing (living people)
Deputies of the 16th National Assembly of the French Fifth Republic